Augusta Rozsypalová (19 February 1857 – 23 November 1925) was a Czechoslovakian teacher and politician. In 1920 she was one of the first group of women elected to the Chamber of Deputies, remaining in parliament until her death five years later.

Biography
Rozsypalová was born in Görkau in the Austrian Empire (now Jirkov, Czech Republic) in 1857. She trained to be a handicraft teacher in Laun. After working in Kuttenberg, she became a teacher in Blowitz and then taught at the Eugenum Institute in Kladen and a school in Pilsen. She was a member of the Union of Christian Teachers and the Union of Catholic Teachers. Having also become involved in Catholic women's associations, she was one of the founders of the Women's Christian-Social Movement and was appointed editor of the Žena magazine in 1918.

Following the independence of Czechoslovakia at the end of World War I, in 1919 Rozsypalová was a founder member of the Czechoslovak People's Party (ČSL) and was elected to its executive committee. The following year she was a ČSL candidate for the Chamber of Deputies in the parliamentary elections, and was one of sixteen women elected to parliament. In 1921 she became head of the Union of Catholic Women's Associations in Bohemia. She was elected to the Senate in the 1925 elections, but died before she could take her seat.

References

1857 births
People from Jirkov
Austro-Hungarian educators
Czechoslovak women in politics
Members of the Chamber of Deputies of Czechoslovakia (1920–1925)
KDU-ČSL politicians
1925 deaths